Daniel Larsen may refer to:

Daniel Larsen Schevig, Norwegian military officer and constitutional founding father
Daniel Larsen (mathematician), American mathematician
Daniel Larsen, a magician that participated in the first season of Norske Talenter
Daniel Larsen, drummer in Dominus (band)

See also
Daniel Larsson (disambiguation)
Daniel Larson, baseball player